Burma News International (BNI) is a news coalition based in Myanmar (Burma). BNI aggregates and publishes bilingual Burmese and English news content from affiliated news agencies on its online portal. BNI's inclusive representation among the country's ethnic minorities, including the Chin, Karenni, Mon, Rakhine, Rohingya, and Shan, has broadened the depth of news coverage of issues impacting Myanmar's rural areas and border regions.

History 
BNI was launched in 2003 by four independent news agencies based in western Myanmar, near the borders with Bangladesh and India. Over the years, its membership has expanded to include news agencies operating near Myanmar's border with Thailand.

In 2008, in the lead-up to the 2008 Myanmar constitutional referendum, BNI launched a pioneering nationwide survey assessing the Burmese public's sentiment toward the military-drafted 2008 Constitution of Myanmar in 13 of the country's 14 divisions.

Since 2013, it has run the Myanmar Peace Monitor project, which tracks progress and key stakeholders toward peace and reconciliation in the country.

Members 
BNI appoints a 'duty editor' from its member journalists to check stories posted by member agencies, write editorials, and oversee BNI's weekly news package. , BNI has fifteen affiliated members, including:

 Chin World
 Development Media Group
 Independent Mon News Agency (IMNA)
 Kachin News Group
 Kaladan Press Network
 Kantarawaddy Times
 Karen Information Center,
 Khonumthung News Group
 Mizzima News
 Myitkyina Journal
 Narinjara News
 Network Media Group
 Shan Herald Agency for News (SHAN)
 Than Lwin Times
 The Voice of Shan Ni

See also 

 Myanmar Now
 Mizzima
 The Irrawaddy

References

External links 

 
 
 
 Myanmar Peace Monitor

Burmese news websites
News agencies based in Myanmar
2002 establishments in Myanmar
Mass media in Yangon